The 2009 Copa Perú season, the promotion tournament of Peruvian football, started on February.

The tournament has 5 stages. The first four stages are played as mini-league round-robin tournaments, except for third stage in region IV, which is played as a knockout stage. The final stage features two knockout rounds and a final four-team group stage to determine the two promoted teams.

The 2009 Peru Cup started with the District Stage on February. The next stage was the Provincial Stage which started, on June. The tournament continued with the Departamental Stage on July. The Regional Staged followed. The National Stage started on November. The winner and runner-up of the National Stage will be promoted to the First Division.

Departmental Stage
Departmental Stage: Ligas Superiores del Peru 2009

The following list shows the teams that qualified for the Regional Stage.

Regional Stage
Each region had two teams qualify for the next stage. The playoffs only determined the respective regional winners.

Region I
Region I includes qualified teams from Amazonas, Lambayeque, Tumbes and Piura region.

Group A

Group B

Playoff

Region II
Region II includes qualified teams from Ancash, Cajamarca, La Libertad and San Martín region.

Group A

Group B

Tiebreaker

Region III
Region III includes qualified teams from Loreto and Ucayali region.

Tiebreaker

Region IV
Region IV includes qualified teams from Lima and Callao region. This region played as a knockout cup system and the finalists qualified.

Semifinals

Final

Region V
Region V includes qualified teams from Junín, Pasco and Huánuco region.

Group A

Group B

Playoff

Region VI
Region VI includes qualified teams from Ayacucho, Huancavelica and Ica region. Two teams qualified from this stage.

Group A

Group B

Playoff

Region VII
Region VII includes qualified teams from Arequipa, Moquegua and Tacna region.

Group A

Group B

Semifinals

Region VIII
Region VIII includes qualified teams from Apurimac, Cusco, Madre de Dios and Puno region.

Group A

Group B

Tiebreaker

Playoff

National Stage
The National Stage started on November 8. This stage had two knockout rounds and four-team group stage. The winner will be promoted to the First Division and the runner-up of the National Stage will be promoted to the Segunda División Peruana.

Round of 16

Quarterfinals

Semifinals

Finals

Notes

External links
  FutbolPeruano.com
  Semanario Pasión

Copa Perú seasons
2009 domestic association football cups
Cop